Nahorevo is a village in the Centar municipality, in the town of  Sarajevo, Federation of Bosnia and Herzegovina, Bosnia and Herzegovina.

Demographics

Ethnic composition, 1991 census

total: 697

 ethnic Muslims - 410 (58.82%) 
 Serbs - 282 (40.45%)
 Croats - 2 (0.28%)
 Yugoslavs - 2 (0.28%)
 others and unknown - 1 (0.14%)

According to the 2013 census, its population was 541.

References

Populated places in Centar, Sarajevo
Neighbourhoods in Grad Sarajevo